At the Party (stylized as AT THE PARTY) is female duo Soulhead's tenth single and released on June 2, 2004. The single failed to chart on Oricon and recochoku.

Information
At the Party is a dance track infused with hip-hop. Some of the lyrics were taken from the 2001 version of Lady Marmalade, which was performed by Christina Aguilera, Lil' Kim, Mýa and Pink for the Moulin Rouge! soundtrack.

This song came from their second studio album, Braided, which was released two months prior on April 28, 2004. The single also received a vinyl release, which received five versions of the song.

Track listing

CD
"At the Party"
"At the Party" [Remix]"
"At the Party" (Instrumental)

12"
Side A
"At the Party"
"At the Party" (Instrumental)
"At the Party" (A Capella)
Side B
"At the Party" [Remix]
"At the Party" [Remix] (Instrumental)

References

2004 songs